Fløtatinden (also called Trondskjortetinden) is a mountain in the municipality of Molde in Møre og Romsdal county, Norway. The summit is a popular ski destination, accessed from the east.

The mountain is located on the eastern shore of the lake Eikesdalsvatnet, and it has a view towards the Mardalsfossen waterfall in the south and the mountain Skjorta in the north.

See also
List of mountains of Norway

References

Mountains of Møre og Romsdal
Molde